Janice "Jan" Schmidt is a New Hampshire politician.

Education
Schmidt has an associates degree in business.

Professional career
Schmidt represented the Hillsborough 28 district from 2012 to 2014. In 2016, Schmidt was again elected to the New Hampshire House of Representatives where she represents the Hillsborough 28 district. Schmidt is a Democrat. Schmidt endorsed Bernie Sanders in the 2020 Democratic Party presidential primaries.

In 2017, Schmidt was also elected to the Nashua Board of Aldermen as the Ward 1 Alderman. She was reelected to this position in 2019.

Personal life
Schmidt resides in Nashua, New Hampshire. Schmidt is married and has two children.

References

Living people
Women state legislators in New Hampshire
People from Nashua, New Hampshire
Democratic Party members of the New Hampshire House of Representatives
21st-century American women politicians
21st-century American politicians
Year of birth missing (living people)